The 2008–09 Campionato Sammarinese di Calcio season was the twenty-fourth since its establishment. The season began with the first regular season games on 12 September 2008 and ended with the play-off final on 29 May 2009.

Participating teams

 S.P. Cailungo (Borgo Maggiore)
 S.S. Cosmos (Serravalle)
 F.C. Domagnano (Domagnano)
 S.C. Faetano (Faetano)
 S.S. Folgore/Falciano (Serravalle)
 F.C. Fiorentino (Fiorentino)
 A.C. Juvenes/Dogana (Serravalle)
 S.S. Pennarossa (Chiesanuova)
 S.P. La Fiorita (Montegiardino)
 A.C. Libertas (Borgo Maggiore)
 S.S. Murata (San Marino)
 S.S. San Giovanni (Borgo Maggiore)
 S.P. Tre Fiori (Fiorentino)
 S.P. Tre Penne (Serravalle)
 S.S. Virtus (Acquaviva)

Venues
The teams do not have grounds of their own due to restricted space in San Marino. Each match was randomly assigned to one of the following grounds:
 Stadio Olimpico (Serravalle)
 Campo di Fiorentino (Fiorentino)
 Campo di Acquaviva (Chiesanuova)
 Campo di Dogana (Serravalle)
 Campo Fonte dell'Ovo (Domagnano)
 Campo di Serravalle "B" (Serravalle)

Regular season

Group A

Group B

Results
All teams play twice against the teams within their own group and once against the teams from the other group.

Play-off
The playoff was held in a double-eliminination format. Both group winners earned a bye in the first and second round.

First round
The matches were played on 7 May 2009.

Second round
The matches were played on 12 May 2009.

Third round
The matches were played on 15 and 16 May 2009.

Fourth round
The matches were played on 19 and 20 May 2009.

Semifinal
The match was played on 25 May 2009 at Stadio Olimpico, Serravalle.

Final
The final was played on 29 May 2009 at Stadio Olimpico, Serravalle. The winners qualified for the first qualifying round of the UEFA Champions League 2009–10.

References 

Campionato Sammarinese di Calcio
San Marino
1